The Marble Steps Leading to the Church of Santa Maria in Aracoeli in Rome is a painting by the Danish painter, C. W. Eckersberg. It was painted in 1814–1816.

Choosing a position from below, Eckersberg created a composition of firm vertical and diagonal lines in this painting of Santa Maria in Ara Coeli, a medieval church in Rome. He painted the picture while being outside and carefully recorded the mid-morning sunlight and shadows.

References 

Paintings by Christoffer Wilhelm Eckersberg
1816 paintings
Religious paintings
Architecture paintings
Paintings in the collection of the National Gallery of Denmark
19th-century paintings in Denmark
Churches in art
Images of Rome